Wallace Rea (21 August 1935 – May 1998) was a Scottish professional footballer who played as a right winger.

Career
Born in Uddingston, Rea played for Royal Albert, Third Lanark, Motherwell and Bradford City.

References

1935 births
1998 deaths
Scottish footballers
Royal Albert F.C. players
Third Lanark A.C. players
Motherwell F.C. players
Bradford City A.F.C. players
Scottish Football League players
English Football League players
Date of death missing
Association football wingers